Naaldwijk is a town in the Dutch province of South Holland. It is a part of the municipality of Westland, and lies about 10 km southwest of The Hague.

Naaldwijk lies in the heart of Westland. The largest economic sector is greenhouse horticulture.

Naaldwijk was previously a municipality in its own right, covering an area of 25.33 km² (of which 0.23 km² water). It included the towns Honselersdijk and Maasdijk.

On 1 January 2004 the municipality of Naaldwijk was merged with the neighbouring municipalities De Lier, 's-Gravenzande, Monster, and Wateringen to create the
municipality of Westland. Naaldwijk is now the administrative capital of Westland.

The village of "Naaldwijk" has a population of around 15,440.
The statistical area "Naaldwijk", which also can include the surrounding countryside, has a population of around 17,370.

Areas and neighbourhoods
 Galgenblok
 Opstal
 Woerdblok (Waterwijk, Zandstrand, Zandheuvel, Waterrijk)
 Pijletuinen
 Kruisbroek
 Geestcomplex
 Hoogeland
 Floriëndaal

Image gallery

References

External links

Municipalities of the Netherlands disestablished in 2004
Populated places in South Holland
Former municipalities of South Holland
Westland (municipality), Netherlands